Seamus Anthony "Shay" Brennan (6 May 1937 – 9 June 2000) was an Irish footballer in the 1960s. He was a full back for Manchester United.

His first game for the club came in an FA Cup match against Sheffield Wednesday on 19 February 1958; this was United's first game after the Munich air disaster and Brennan scored twice on an emotionally charged night. He was playing as an outside-left in this game, the position left vacant following the death of David Pegg and the injuries to Albert Scanlon in the crash.

He helped United to the 1965 and 1967 Division One championships, as well as the European Cup. Born in Manchester, England, he played internationally for the Republic of Ireland, qualifying through his parentage—the first Irish international to qualify in this way. He retired from Manchester United in 1970 after playing 359 games and scoring six goals.

Brennan moved to Ireland where he became player-manager with Waterford United, winning two titles and three further international caps. He left at the end of the 1973–74 season.

Brennan had his testimonial on 14 August 1986 when Shamrock Rovers defeated Manchester United 2–0 at Glenmalure Park.

He died, aged 63, after suffering a heart attack while playing golf at Courtown golf club, on 9 June 2000 and was buried at his adopted town of Tramore. He was the first member of the 1968 European Cup winning side to die, the second being George Best in November 2005.

Honours

Player
Manchester United
Football League First Division (2): 1964–65, 1966–67
European Cup (1): 1967–68
FA Charity Shield (2): 1965, 1967

Manager
Waterford United
League of Ireland (2): 1971–72, 1972–73
League of Ireland Cup (1): 1973–74
Top Four Cup (2): 1970–71,1972–73
Texaco Cup (1): 1974–75

See also
 List of Republic of Ireland international footballers born outside the Republic of Ireland

References

External links
 

1937 births
2000 deaths
English people of Irish descent
Republic of Ireland association footballers
Republic of Ireland international footballers
Manchester United F.C. players
Footballers from Manchester
Waterford F.C. players
League of Ireland players
Waterford F.C. managers
League of Ireland managers
League of Ireland XI players
Association football fullbacks
Republic of Ireland football managers
UEFA Champions League winning players